Novak Djokovic defeated Rafael Nadal in the final, 6–3, 6–2, 6–3 to win the men's singles tennis title at the 2019 Australian Open. It was his record-breaking seventh Australian Open title and 15th major title overall, surpassing Pete Sampras for third place on the all-time list (behind Roger Federer and Nadal). Djokovic and Nadal were also in contention for the world No. 1 singles ranking; Djokovic retained the top ranking by reaching the fourth round. Nadal attempted to become the first man in the Open Era to achieve a double career Grand Slam (he would eventually achieve the feat in 2022).

Roger Federer was the two-time defending champion, but lost in the fourth round to Stefanos Tsitsipas. Tsitsipas became the first Greek player to reach the semifinals at a singles major, after becoming the first man representing Greece to win a main-draw singles match at the Australian Open.

This was the first Australian Open since 1976 to feature a final set tie-break. Upon reaching 6–6 in the fifth set, a match tie-break is played where the winner is the first to reach ten points and lead by two points. The first men's singles main draw match to feature the ten-point tiebreak was the first-round match between Jérémy Chardy and Ugo Humbert.

Seeds
All seedings per ATP rankings.

Draw

Finals

Top half

Section 1

Section 2

Section 3

Section 4

Bottom half

Section 5

Section 6

Section 7

Section 8

Other entry information

Wildcards

Qualifying

Championship match ratings
554 thousand on ESPN, in the USA

References

External Links
Draw
 2019 Australian Open – Men's draws and results at the International Tennis Federation

Men's Singles
Australian Open (tennis) by year – Men's singles
Australian Open - Men's Singles